Fairview is a hamlet in southern Alberta, Canada within Lethbridge County. More specifically, it is located on southeast corner of Highway 4 (43A Street South) and Highway 512 (1 Avenue South).

The Hamlet of Fairview is one of two different communities in Alberta that go by the name of Fairview.  The Town of Fairview in northern Alberta is the more widely known of the two.

Demographics 

See also 
List of communities in Alberta
List of hamlets in Alberta

References 

Designated places in Alberta
Hamlets in Alberta
Lethbridge County